Beach Towel may refer to:
Beach Towel (towel), is a type of towel
Beach Towel (horse), is a racing horse